The steam locomotives of Oldenburg Class P 4.1 (later DRG Class 36.12) were German locomotives built for the Grand Duchy of Oldenburg State Railways (Großherzoglich Oldenburgische Staatseisenbahnen) between 1896 and 1902. They were based on a Prussian P 4.1 prototype and a total of 19 engines were procured up to 1902. Overall the Oldenburg engine was less powerful than its Prussian counterpart, because the grate area was smaller and the steam dome was omitted. The regulators was housed in the smokebox. The Deutsche Reichsbahn took them over in 1920 and allocated them numbers 36 1201 to 36 1219. They were retired in the 1930s.

They were coupled with tenders of class 3 T 12.

See also 
Grand Duchy of Oldenburg State Railways
List of Oldenburg locomotives and railbuses
Länderbahnen

References 

 
 

4-4-0 locomotives
P 4.1
Railway locomotives introduced in 1896
Hanomag locomotives
Standard gauge locomotives of Germany
2′B n2 locomotives

Passenger locomotives